Agadbam  is a Marathi film released on 18 December 2010. This film  is directed by Satish Motling and produced by Trupti Bhoir. The movie was reported to be an inspiration for the 2015 Hindi movie Dum Laga Ke Haisha.

Cast 
The film stars Makarand Anaspure, Trupti Bhoir, Usha Nadkarni, Tejaswi Patil, Chitra Navathe, Vikas Samudre, Narayan Jadhav & Others.

Soundtrack
The music has been directed by Ajit – Sameer, while the lyrics have been provided by Guru Thakur.

Track listing

References 

2010 films
2010s Marathi-language films